James Mackay Drummond (17 October 1869–6 September 1940) was a New Zealand journalist, naturalist and writer. He was born in Thames, Thames/Coromandel, New Zealand on 17 October 1869.

References

External links
 
 

1869 births
1940 deaths
New Zealand journalists
New Zealand biologists
People from Thames, New Zealand